The Roman Catholic Diocese of Diamantino is a diocese located in the city of Diamantino in the Ecclesiastical province of Cuiabá in Brazil.

History
 22 March 1929: Established as Territorial Prelature of Diamantino from the Metropolitan Archdiocese of Cuiabá
 16 October 1979: Promoted as Diocese of Diamantino
 6 February 1982: Lost territory to establish Diocese of Sinop
 23 December 1997: Lost territory, along with Diocese of Ji-Paraná, to establish Diocese of Juína

Bishops

Ordinaries, in reverse chronological order
 Bishops of Diamantino (Latin Rite)
 Vital Chitolina, S.C.I. (2011.12.28 - present)
 Canísio Klaus (1998.08.26 – 2011.12.28), appointed Bishop of Santa Cruz do Sul, Rio Grande do Sul
 Agostinho Willy Kist, S.J. (1982.11.15 – 1998.08.26)
 Henrique Froehlich, S.J. (1979.10.16 – 1982.03.25), appointed Bishop of Sinop, Mato Grosso
 Prelates of Diamantino (Roman Rite) 
 Henrique Froehlich, S.J. (1971.11.29 – 1979.10.16)
 Alonso Silveira de Mello, S.J. (1955.06.13 – 1971.11.29; Apostolic Administrator 1949.11.12 – 1955.06.13)

Coadjutor bishop
Canísio Klaus (1998)

References
 GCatholic.org
 Catholic Hierarchy

Roman Catholic dioceses in Brazil
Christian organizations established in 1929
Diamantino, Roman Catholic Diocese of
Roman Catholic dioceses and prelatures established in the 20th century